Paula Bieler (born 31 March 1988) is a Swedish former politician for the Sweden Democrats party. She became a member of the party in 2009. In November 2013 Bieler became an elected member of Sweden Democrats party council. In the 2014 Swedish general election, Bieler was the party's number six national candidate for the Riksdag, and was elected a member of the Riksdag. Since April 2014 Bieler has also been the party's official political spokesman on gender and gay rights. On 11 February 2020, Bieler revealed that she was leaving the Riksdag in an interview with the Swedish tabloid Expressen. Shortly afterwards the podcast Lögnarnas Tempel revealed that she has also left the Sweden Democrats. 

It was widely reported that a fellow SD member used an antisemitic slur against Bieler, who then was an active politician, during a party meeting.

Early life 
Paula Bieler was born on 31 March 1988 in Västerås, Västmanland, but grew up in Täby. Both of Bieler's parents are from Poland. Bieler's father was Jewish, the son of a high ranking Communist politician who had to escape Poland due to an antisemitic campaign by the government.

References 

1988 births
Members of the Riksdag from the Sweden Democrats
Living people
People from Västerås
Swedish people of Polish-Jewish descent
21st-century Swedish politicians
21st-century Swedish women politicians
Women members of the Riksdag
Members of the Riksdag 2014–2018
Stockholm University alumni
Uppsala University alumni